St. Mary's Girls High School is a sister school of St. Thomas Higher Secondary School, Kozhencherry in Kerala, the South Western state in India. It is located at Keezhukara, and is about a kilometer from the Kozhencherry town centre.

Kozhencherry

In the early twentieth century, Kozhencherry was a small village in Pathanamthitta Taluk of Quilon District in the princely state of Travancore. The land was fertile and so the people were mainly farmers. Kozhencherry, on the banks of River Pamba was a commercial hub when river boats were the main mode of transport.

Meaning of certain terms
The naming system adopted in Kerala schools are as follows.

Primary school: In earlier days classes included-  Class 1 to class 4. Later Preparatory classes from Lower secondary was moved to Primary and was named Class 5.
Upper primary (Primary schools): In earlier days classes included- Preparatory, Form I, II and III. Later after moving Preparatory class to primary section, classes included Standards 6 to 8.
Secondary (High schools): In earlier days classes included- Form IV, V and VI. 
Later it was changed to Standards 9 and 10, Form VI became part of +2.
Higher secondary schools: When pre-university class from colleges affiliated to universities were moved to Upper secondary, such schools changed the name to Higher secondary schools. These schools include Standards 9, 10 and +2.
Headmaster and Principals: Titles of the head of Higher secondary schools are Principals and others, Headmaster/Headmistress.

History
It is the far sightedness of some of the leaders in Kozhencherry, that made it a 100% literate town in Kerala.

An English Medium School was opened in Kozhencherry by the Kottayam (Anglican) Mission in 1822 with 40 students and two teachers. In 1904 the St. Thomas Mar Thoma parish took over the responsibility of running the school and named it St. Thomas school. By 1910, The Travancore Education Code of 1085 M.E. (1910) came into force and St. Thomas school was approved as a recognised Middle School (Form I, II and III).

Realising the necessity to educate girls, Kurumthottical Rev. K.T. Thomas built a Middle school (Form I to III) in 1930 for girls students only. Mrs Aley Eapen from Mavelikara was its headmistress.

In 1941 this girls school was approved as a High School (Form I to VI). When St.Mary’s Girls High School was opened and all the girls from St. Thomas High school were moved to the new school.

From 1941 to 1944 Mrs. Mariam Thomas was the headmistress. She was followed by Mrs. Aleyamma Cherian, Mr. K.C. Varghese, Miss Rahel Mathen, Miss M.G. Aleyamma, Miss Accamma Varghese, Miss Chachi Chacko. They were headmistresses till 1951. Miss Rachel K. Thomas, daughter of Kurumthottical Rev. K.T. Thomas was the headmistress from 1951-’78. Her successors were Mrs. Saramma C Thomas (1978-’82), Mr. Thomas Mathew (1982-’83), Mrs. M.V. Sosamma (1983-’85), Mrs. Mrs. Aleyamma Samuel (1983 - ) and so on.

Courses offered
The school now offers the following courses (following Kerala Government Syllabus)
Upper Primary –
High School –

Management
This school is managed by St. Thomas Marthoma Church, Kozhencherry. The vicar is the ex-officio Manager of the school.

Managers
Rev. K.T. Thomas, Kurumthottickal (1941-‘55), Rev. K.J. Philip (1956-’59), Rev. K.C. Thomas (1960-‘61), Rev. C.G. Alexander (1961-’62), Rev. C.G. David (1963-’66), Rev. K.C. George (1966-’67),  Rev. C.G. Alexander (1967-’72), Rev. P.M. George (1973-’77), Rev. Oommen Koruthu (1977-’80), Rev. Dr. V.P. Thomas (1980-’82), Rev. M.O. Ommen (1983-’84), Rev. M.C. Mani (1984-’88), Rev. P.V. George (1988-’91), Rev. P.V. Thomas (1991-’95), Rev. Dr. P.P. Abraham (1995-’96), Rev. D. Philip (1996–2001), Rev. P.T. Thomas (2001-’06), Rev. Philip Varghese (2006-’09), Very Rev. K.M. Mammen (2009-2013), Rev. Roy Thomas (May 2013 - ).

References

External links
 Welcome to St.Thomas Higher Secondary, St.Marys High School & St.Thomas High School

Girls' schools in Kerala
Christian schools in Kerala
High schools and secondary schools in Kerala
Schools in Pathanamthitta district